Richard Jouve (born 25 October 1994) is a French cross-country skier who has competed since 2015. He won the 2021-22 Sprint World Cup as the first Frenchman to win a discipline globe at the FIS Cross-Country World Cup.

Career
Jouve, having competed in only three previous World Cup races, placed 3rd in the freestyle sprint at Lahti in 2015. In 2016, at Planica he again placed third, finishing behind Federico Pellegrino and countryman Baptiste Gros. In the team sprint the next day, Jouve and Valentin Chauvin placed third again behind Gros and Renaud Jay to end a strong weekend for the French. Jouve closed out his 2016 season by finishing second in the sprint at Gatineau.

Jouve won the sprint event at the 2016 Blink ski festival.

Cross-country skiing results
All results are sourced from the International Ski Federation (FIS).

Olympic Games
 2 medals – (2 bronze)

Distance reduced to 30 km due to weather conditions.

World Championships
 2 medals – (2 bronze)

World Cup

Season titles
 1 title – (1 sprint)

Season standings

Individual podiums
4 victories – (4 ) 
18 podiums – (11 , 7 )

Team podiums
1 victory – (1 ) 
3 podiums – (3 )

References

External links

Living people
1994 births
French male cross-country skiers
People from Briançon
Cross-country skiers at the 2012 Winter Youth Olympics
Cross-country skiers at the 2018 Winter Olympics
Cross-country skiers at the 2022 Winter Olympics
Olympic cross-country skiers of France
Medalists at the 2018 Winter Olympics
Medalists at the 2022 Winter Olympics
Olympic bronze medalists for France
Olympic medalists in cross-country skiing
Sportspeople from Hautes-Alpes
FIS Nordic World Ski Championships medalists in cross-country skiing